Homeobox protein SIX3 is a protein that in humans is encoded by the SIX3 gene.

Function 

The SIX homeobox 3 (SIX3) gene is crucial in embryonic development by providing necessary instructions for the formation of the forebrain and eye development. SIX3 is a transcription factor that binds to specific DNA sequences, controlling whether the gene is active or inactive. Activity of the SIX3 gene represses Wnt1 gene activity which ensures development of the forebrain and establishes the proper anterior posterior identity in the mammalian brain. By blocking Wnt1 activity, SIX3 is able to prevent abnormal expansion of the posterior portion of the brain into the anterior brain area.

During retinal development, SIX3 has been proven to hold a key responsibility in the activation of Pax6, the master regulator of eye development. Furthermore, SIX3 assumes its activity in the PLE (presumptive lens ectoderm), the region in which the lens is expected to develop. If its presence is removed from this region, the lens fails to thicken and construct itself to its proper morphological state. Also, SIX3 plays a strategic role in the activation of SOX2. 

SIX3 has also been proven to play a role in repression of selected members of the Wnt family. In retinal development, SIX3 is responsible for the repression of Wnt8b. Also, in forebrain development, SIX3 is responsible for the repression of Wnt1 and activation of SHH, Sonic Hedgehog gene.

Clinical significance 

Mutations in SIX3 are the cause of a severe brain malformation, called holoprosencephaly type 2 (HPE2). In HPE2, the brain fails to separate into two hemispheres during early embryonic development, leading to eye and brain malformations, which result in serious facial abnormalities.

A mutant zebrafish knockout model has been developed, in which the anterior part of the head was missing due to the atypical increase of Wnt1 activity. When injected with SIX3, these zebrafish embryos were able to successfully develop a normal forebrain. When SIX3 was turned off in mice, it resulted in a lack of retina formation due to excessive expression of Wnt8b in the region where the forebrain normally develops. Both of these studies demonstrate the importance of SIX3 activity in brain and eye development.

Interactions 

SIX3 has been shown to interact with TLE1 and Neuron-derived orphan receptor 1.

References

Further reading

External links 
  GeneReviews/NCBI/NIH/UW entry on Anophthalmia / Microphthalmia Overview

Transcription factors
Developmental neuroscience